Robert Lawson (October 4, 1892 – May 27, 1957) was an American writer and illustrator of children's books. He won the Caldecott Medal for his illustrations in They Were Strong and Good in 1941 and the Newbery award for his short story for Rabbit Hill in 1945.

Background
Born in New York City, Lawson spent his early life in Montclair, New Jersey. Following high school, he studied art for three years under illustrator Howard Giles (an advocate of dynamic symmetry as conceived by Jay Hambidge) at the New York School of Fine and Applied Art (now Parsons School of Design), marrying fellow artist and illustrator Marie Abrams in 1922. His career as an illustrator began in 1914, when his illustration for a poem about the invasion of Belgium was published in Harper's Weekly. He went on to publish in other magazines, including the Ladies Home Journal, Everybody's Magazine, Century Magazine, Vogue, and Designer.

Camouflage service
During World War I, Lawson was a member of the first U.S. Army camouflage unit, the American Camouflage Corps, in which he served in France with fellow artists Barry Faulkner, Sherry Edmundson Fry, William Twigg-Smith and Kerr Eby (Behrens 2009). In his autobiography, Faulkner recalls that Lawson had a remarkable "sense of fantasy and humor", which made him especially valuable when the camoufleurs put on musical shows for the children of the French women who worked with them on camouflage (Faulkner 1957).

Children's books

After the war, Lawson resumed his work as an artist, and in 1922, illustrated his first children's book, The Wonderful Adventures of Little Prince Toofat. Subsequently, he illustrated dozens of children's books by other authors, including such well-known titles as The Story of Ferdinand (1936) by Munro Leaf and Mr. Popper's Penguins (1938) by Richard and Florence Atwater. In total, he illustrated as many as 40 books by other writers and 17 others that he wrote himself. These latter works included They Were Strong and Good (1940) (which won the Caldecott Medal in 1941), Ben and Me: An Astonishing Life of Benjamin Franklin by His Good Mouse Amos (1939) (which earned a Lewis Carroll Shelf Award in 1961), and Rabbit Hill (1944) (which won the Newbery Award in 1945).

The Story of Ferdinand (which Lawson illustrated) was adapted into Ferdinand the Bull by Walt Disney Productions in 1938. Ben and Me: An Astonishing Life of Benjamin Franklin by His Good Mouse Amos was adapted into the animated short Ben and Me in 1953 by Walt Disney Productions.

Lawson was a witty and inventive writer, and his children's fiction is also engaging for adults. One of his inventive themes was the idea of a person's life as seen through the eyes of a companion animal, an approach that he first realized in Ben and Me. Some of his later books employed the same device (which was compatible with his style of illustration) to other figures, such as Christopher Columbus (I Discover Columbus) and Paul Revere (Mr. Revere and I). Captain Kidd's Cat, which he both wrote and illustrated, is narrated by the feline in the title, named McDermot, who tells the story of the famous pirate's ill-starred voyage, in the process of which he is shown to have been a brave, upright, honest, hen-pecked man betrayed by his friends and calumniated by posterity.  His artistic witticism and creativity can be seen in The Story of Ferdinand the Bull, where he illustrates a cork tree as a tree that bears corks as fruit, ready to be picked and placed into bottles.

Later life
In the early 1930s, Lawson became interested in etching. One of the resulting prints was awarded the John Taylor Arms Prize by the Society of American Etchers.

Lawson died in 1957 at his home in Westport, Connecticut, in a house that he referred to as Rabbit Hill, since it had been the setting for his book of the same name. He was 64. He is buried in Mountain Grove Cemetery, in Bridgeport, Connecticut. An annual conference is held in his honor in Westport.

The Robert Lawson Papers are in the University of Minnesota Children's Literature Research Collections.

The largest collection of Robert Lawson's art is at the Free Library of Philadelphia Rare Book Department.

Works as author

 Country Colic. Boston: Little, Brown and Co., 1944.
 Rabbit Hill. New York: Viking Press, 1944. also Junior Literary Guild
 Mr. Wilmer. Boston: Little, Brown and Co., 1945.
 At That Time. New York: Viking Press, 1947.
 Mr. Twigg's Mistake. Boston: Little, Brown and Co., 1947.
 Robbut: A Tale of Tails. New York: Viking Press, 1948.
 Dick Whittington and His Cat. New York: Limited Editions Club, 1949.
 The Fabulous Flight. Boston: Little, Brown and Co., 1949.
 Smeller Martin. New York: Viking Press, 1950.
 McWhinney's Jaunt. Boston: Little, Brown and Co., 1951.
 Edward, Hoppy and Joe. New York: Alfred A. Knopf, 1952.
 Mr. Revere and I. Boston: Little, Brown and Co., 1953.
 The Tough Winter. New York: Viking Press, 1954. also Junior Literary Guild
 Captain Kidd's Cat. Boston: Little, Brown and Co., 1956.
 The Great Wheel. New York: Viking Press, 1957.
 Yolen, Jane. Spaceships & Spells: A collection of new fantasy and science-fiction stories. New York: Harper & Row, (1987). Contains the Robert Lawson short story "The Silver Leopard".

Works as illustrator

 Chester, George Randolph, The Wonderful Adventures of Little Prince Toofat. New York: James A. McCann, 1922.
 Mason, Arthur, The Wee Men of Ballywooden. Garden City, New York: Doubleday, Doran, 1930; New York: Viking Press, 1952.
 Bianco, Margery Williams, "The House That Grew Small". St. Nicholas Magazine 58 (September 1931): 764–66, 782–83.
 Mason, Arthur, From the Horn of the Moon. Garden City, New York: Doubleday, Doran, 1931. Excerpted as "Moving of the Bog", St. Nicholas Magazine 58 (July 1931): 644–47, 667–70.
 Mason, Arthur, The Roving Lobster. Garden City, New York: Doubleday, Doran, 1931.
 Untermeyer, Louis, "The Donkey of God". St. Nicholas Magazine 59 (December 1931): 59–61, 105–108.
 Ring, Barbara, Peik. Translated by Lorence Munson Woodside. Boston: Little, Brown and Co., 1932.
 Young, Ella, The Unicorn with Silver Shoes. New York: Longmans, Green, 1932.
 Bianco, Margery Williams, The Hurdy-Gurdy Man. New York: Oxford University Press, 1933.
 Marquand, John P., Haven's End. Boston: Little, Brown and Co., 1933.
 Haines, William Wister, Slim. Boston: Little, Brown and Co., 1934.
 Tarn, William Woodthorpe, The Treasure of the Isle of Mist. New York: G. P. Putnam's Sons, 1934. also Junior Literary Guild
 Coatsworth, Elizabeth, The Golden Horseshoe. New York: Macmillan & Co., 1935; rev. ed., 1968.
 Sterne, Emma Gelders, Drums of Monmouth. New York: Dodd, Mead & Co., 1935.
 Bates, Helen Dixon, Betsy Ross. New York: Whittlesey House and McGraw-Hill, 1936.
 Bates, Helen Dixon, Francis Scott Key. New York: Whittlesey House and McGraw-Hill, 1936.
 Gale, Elizabeth, Seven Beads of Wampum. New York: G. P. Putnam's Sons, 1936. also Junior Literary Guild
 Glenn, Mabelle, et al., eds., Tunes and Harmonies. Boston: Athenaeum Press, 1936. The Revised 1943 edition is lacking the Full Page, Two-Color illustration  found at page 8 in the 1936 edition. 
 Leaf, Munro, The Story of Ferdinand. New York: Viking Press, 1936.
 Barnes, Ruth A., ed., I Hear America Singing: An Anthology of Folk Poetry. Chicago: John C. Winston Co. and the Junior Literary Guild, 1937.
 Bowie, Walter Russell, The Story of Jesus for Young People. New York: Charles Scribner's Sons, 1937.
 Brewton, John E., Under the Tent of the Sky: A Collection of Poems about Animals Large and Small. New York: Macmillan & Co., 1937.
 Cormack, Maribelle, Wind of the Vikings: A Tale of the Orkney Isles. New York: D. Appleton-Century, 1937.
 Fish, Helen Dean, ed., Four and Twenty Blackbirds: Nursery Rhymes of Yesterday Recalled for Children of To-Day. New York: Frederick. A. Stokes, 1937.
 MacDonald, Rose Mortimer Ellzey. Nelly Custis Daughter of Mount Vernon. Boston: Athenaeum Press, 1937. Lawson End Pages only 
 Rosmer, Jean, In Secret Service: A Mystery Story of Napoleon's Court. Translated by Virginia Olcott. Philadelphia: J. B. Lippincott, 1937.
 Sterne, Emma Gelders, Miranda Is a Princess: A Story of Old Spain. New York: Dodd, Mead & Co., 1937.
 Stratton, Clarence, Swords and Statues: A Tale of Sixteenth Century Italy. New York: John C. Winston Co. and the Junior Literary Guild, 1937.
 Twain, Mark, The Prince and the Pauper. Chicago: John C. Winston Co., 1937.
 Atwater, Richard, and Florence Atwater, Robert Lawson (illustrator). Mr. Popper's Penguins. Boston: Little, Brown and Co., 1938.
 Farjeon, Eleanor, One Foot in Fairyland. New York: Frederick A. Stokes, 1938.
 Haines, William Wister, High Tension. Boston: Little, Brown and Co., 1938.
 Leaf, Munro, Wee Gillis. New York: Viking Press, 1938.
 Lawson, Robert. Ben and Me. Boston: Little, Brown and Co., 1939.
 Bunyan, John, Pilgrim's Progress. Text revised by Mary Godolphin. New York: Frederick A. Stokes, 1939.
 White, T. H., The Sword in the Stone. New York: G. P. Putnam's Sons, 1939.
 Lawson, Robert. Just for Fun: A Collection of Stories and Verses. Chicago: Rand McNally, 1940.
 Lawson, Robert. They Were Strong and Good. New York: Viking Press, 1940; rev. ed., 1968.
 Brewton, John E, Gaily We Parade: A Collection of Poems about People, Here, There and Everywhere. New York: Macmillan & Co., 1940.
 Lawson, Robert. I Discover Columbus. Boston: Little, Brown and Co., 1941.
 Leaf, Munro, Aesop's Fables. New York: Heritage Press, 1941.
 Leaf, Munro, The Story of Simpson and Sampson. New York: Viking Press, 1941.
 C. S. Forester, Poo-Poo and the Dragons. Boston: Little, Brown and Co., 1942.
 Gray, Elizabeth Janet, Adam of the Road. New York: Viking Press, 1942.
 Lang, Andrew, Prince Prigio. Boston: Little, Brown and Co., 1942.
 Stephens, James, The Crock of Gold. New York: Limited Editions Club, 1942.
 Lawson, Robert. Watchwords of Liberty. Boston: Little, Brown and Co., 1943; rev. ed., 1957.
 Teal, Val, The Little Woman Wanted Noise. New York: Rand McNally, 1943; rev. ed., 1967.
 The Woman's Club of Westport. The Connecticut Cookbook. Westport, Connecticut: Westport Women's Club, 1943, Paperback w/wire spine, (p. 28). Reprinted New York: Harper & Brothers, 1944.
 Neilson, Frances F., and Winthrop Neilson, Benjamin Franklin. Reader in Real People Series. New York: Row, Peterson, 1950. Reprinted 1963 by California State Department of Education. 
 Hall, William, The Shoelace Robin. New York: Thomas Y. Crowell, 1945.
 Robinson, Tom, Greylock and the Robins. New York: Viking Press and the Junior Literary Guild, 1946.
 Potter, Mary A., et al., Mathematics for Success. Boston: Athenaeum Press, 1952. Revised 1960 edition has No Lawson Illustrations.

See also

References

Further reading 
 Faulkner, Barry, Sketches from an Artist's Life. Dublin, New Hampshire: William Bauhan, 1973.
 "Robert Lawson" in Walt Reed, The Illustrator in America 1860–2000. New York: Society of Illustrators, 2001, p. 186. .
 "Robert Lawson" in Roy R. Behrens, Camoupedia: A Compendium of Research on Art, Architecture and Camouflage. Dysart, Iowa: Bobolink Books, 2009, p. 221. .

External links 
 

1892 births
1957 deaths
20th-century American male writers
20th-century American novelists
American children's book illustrators
American children's writers
American male novelists
United States Army personnel of World War I
Burials at Mountain Grove Cemetery, Bridgeport
Caldecott Medal winners
Newbery Medal winners
Newbery Honor winners
Novelists from Connecticut
Novelists from New Jersey
Novelists from New York (state)
People from Montclair, New Jersey
People from Westport, Connecticut
Writers from New York City